Ernesto Albán Mosquera (June 5, 1912 in Ambato – July 22, 1984 in Quito) was a popular vaudeville and film actor in Ecuador.

Biography

Alban was born in Ambato in 1912. His parents were Luis Alfonso Albán Egüez and Dolores Mosquera Veloz.

He started as a singer of tangos and later became one of the most popular actors in Ecuador. He started acting in theatrical plays in the 1930s. He and his wife, Chavica Gómez, gained fame as actors, and formed a theater company, which consisted of other acclaimed actors such as Oscar Guerra and Lastenia Rivadeneira, with whom he launched the "Estampas Quiteñas", comedies regarding the humor of everyday life in Ecuador.

He performed in plays such as En un burro tres baturros by Alberto Novión from Argentina, A Campo Atraviesa by Felipe Sassone from Peru, and Argentino en Madrid, as well as French vaudevilles and the Spanish comedies of Carlos Arniches, Navarro y Torrado, Linares Rivas, Joaquín Dicenta, Jacinto Benavente and others.

He also co-produced Mexican films, in which he played roles. He appeared in the films En la mitad del mundo (1964), 'Santo' contra los secuestradores (1973) and Fiebre de juventud (1966).

He was widely associated with the comedic character he played named "Evaristo Corral y Chancletain" in the "Estampas Quiteñas", created by the writer Alfonso García Muñoz. Albán Mosquera was greatly influenced by Charles Chaplin.

He died in Quito on July 22, 1984 at the age of 72. His body is buried in the Cementerio Parques del Recuerdo in Quito.

Filmography

1981  "Dos para el camino" (Alejandro)

References 

People from Ambato, Ecuador
Ecuadorian male film actors
1912 births
1984 deaths
20th-century Ecuadorian male actors
Ecuadorian male stage actors